Ramarao on Duty is a 2022 Indian Telugu-language mystery action drama film written and directed by Sarath Mandava. Produced by SLV Cinemas and RT Team Works, it stars Ravi Teja in titular role alongside Divyansha Kaushik, Rajisha Vijayan (in her Telugu debut), Chaitanya Krishna, and Venu Thottempudi. The plot follows Ramarao, an honest civil servant, who is on mission to eradicate corruption to help the people suffering from poverty.

The film began its production is July 2021 in Hyderabad with filming also taking place in Andhra Pradesh and Spain. Ramarao on Duty was released theatrically on 29 July 2022 to mixed to negative reviews from critics.

Plot

In 1995, B. Ramarao is a deputy collector turned M.R.O, who is posted to Chittoor. Upon arriving with his family and getting posted, his ex-girlfriend Malini files a police complaint, stating that her husband Surendra is missing. Ramarao learns about a few unsolved murder cases in the area and decides to crack them, along with helping Malini, with the help of the local police department.

Whilst investigating the case, he learns that an illegal red sandalwood smuggling racket is behind the murders. How do Ramarao and the police capture the illegal smuggling racket, with evidence, and how is all this related to Surendra forms the crux of the plot.

Cast

Production 
The film was tentatively titled as RT68 as it is intended to be Ravi Teja's 68th film as a lead actor. In July 2021, the film's official title was unveiled as Ramarao on Duty. Principal photography of the film began on 1 July 2021 in Hyderabad. The film has wrapped for its final schedule of the shoot in October 2021. Filming also took place at Maredumilli forest, East Godavari District in Andhra Pradesh. The production moved to Spain in March 2022 to picturize few songs.

Music 

The soundtrack and score of the film is composed by Sam C. S.

Release

Theatrical
The film was finally released theatrically on 29 July 2022, after postponing 2 times from 25th March 2022 and 17th June 2022. It is rumoured that the movie underwent too many hassles in post production  Earlier in December 2021, its release date was announced as 25 March 2022. In February 2022, the makers announced their intention to release the film on 25 March 2022 if RRR was to be postponed from that date, else on 17 June 2022. In March, the film's release was postponed to on 17 June 2022. In May 2022, the film was postponed due to production delays.

Home media
The digital streaming rights of the film were acquired by SonyLIV. The film was digitally streamed on SonyLIV from 15 September 2022 in Telugu and dubbed versions of Tamil, Hindi, Malayalam and Kannada languages.

Reception
Rama Rao on Duty received negative reviews from critics and audience with criticism towards storyline and dull performances.

Ram Venkat Srikar of Cinema Express rated the film 2.5 out of 5 stars and wrote "Ramarao On Duty misses a great opportunity to blend the masala we love in Telugu films with a genre, and ends up underwhelming us on both fronts". Writing for The Hindu, Sangeetha Devi Dundoo stated that "The forest zone and a plot involving red sandalwood smuggling might remind us of Pushpa: The Rise, but this film just does not have that chutzpah. Neither is it as content driven as the makers would like to believe".  Neeshita Nyayapati of The Times of India rated the film 2 out of 5 stars and wrote "Rama Rao on Duty is a chore to sit through, meandering between being a proper thriller and a masala entertainer that's not engaging." Balakrishna Ganeshan of The News Minute rated the film 1.5 out of 5 stars and wrote "Rama Rao On Duty is a glorious misfire and a superficial attempt with plenty of loopholes that leave you dissatisfied". A critic for The Hans India rated the film 1.5 out of 5 stars and wrote "First half of the film is more of conversational and passive. The writing gives an overstuffed feeling".

References

External links 
 

2022 films
2020s Telugu-language films
Indian action thriller films
Films scored by Sam C. S.
Films shot in Hyderabad, India
Films shot in Andhra Pradesh
Films shot in Spain
Films set in Andhra Pradesh
2022 action thriller films
Films set in 1995